VA-214 was a short-lived Attack Squadron of the U.S. Navy. It was established on 15 September 1948 at Naval Air Station Seattle, Washington, and disestablished eight months later, on 16 May 1949. Its insignia and nickname are unknown.

The squadron was established with the mission of being an all-weather attack unit and part of a carrier air group that was to be all-weather capable. Squadron personnel attended instrument training at the Fleet All-Weather Training Unit, Pacific. It flew the TBM-3E Avenger.

A second VA-214 was established as Fighter Squadron VF-214 on 30 March 1955, redesignated as VA-214 on 11 October 1956 and disestablished on 1 August 1958.

See also
 List of squadrons in the Dictionary of American Naval Aviation Squadrons
 Attack aircraft
 List of inactive United States Navy aircraft squadrons
 History of the United States Navy

References

Attack squadrons of the United States Navy
Wikipedia articles incorporating text from the Dictionary of American Naval Aviation Squadrons